Disney Channel is a Canadian English language discretionary specialty channel owned by Corus Entertainment under license from The Walt Disney Company, which began broadcasting on September 1, 2015. It is a localized version of the U.S. basic cable network of the same name, broadcasting live-action and animated programming aimed at children between the ages of 9 to 16.

The channel launched as part of a new licensing agreement between Corus Entertainment and the Disney–ABC Television Group (now known as Walt Disney Television), which succeeded a previous program supply agreement between Disney and Family Channel (owned by WildBrain). Its launch marked the first time that a Disney Channel-branded television service has operated in Canada.

History

Background (1988–2015) 

At the time of its launch in 1988, Family Channel, owned by DHX Media, held Canadian rights to Disney Channel's programming library. As such, it operated licensed Canadian versions of Disney Channel's spinoff brands, Disney XD and Disney Junior as sister networks.

Launch and development (2015–2017) 
On April 16, 2015, Corus Entertainment announced that it had reached a "landmark" agreement with the Disney–ABC Television Group to acquire long-term, Canadian multi-platform rights to Disney Channel's programming library; the cost and duration of the licensing deal were not disclosed. Corus also announced that it would launch a Canadian version of Disney Channel on September 1, 2015; the service consists of a linear television channel, along with TV Everywhere apps (Watch Disney Channel Canada), and video-on-demand services for television platforms. This marks Corus' second Disney/ABC-licensed service behind ABC Spark – a localized version of ABC Family. At launch, Corus stated that Disney Channel was available in 10 million households, with carriage across most major Canadian cable providers including Rogers, EastLink, and Access Communications, IPTV providers Bell MTS, Bell Fibe TV, Telus Optik TV, SaskTel, VMedia, and Execulink Telecom, and national satellite providers Bell Satellite TV and Shaw Direct.

Corus stated that it would transition "select Disney branded kids linear television offerings" to new properties under its ownership in the future; and brand new Corus-operated Disney Junior and Disney XD services launched on December 1, 2015. In the meantime, Disney Channel aired blocks featuring selected Disney Junior and XD programs. Until the Disney XD and Junior blocks were finished on this channel, and for the 2015–16 television season, DHX consequently re-branded its Disney XD and Junior networks as Family CHRGD (later WildBrainTV) and Family Jr. respectively, and began phasing out Disney programming from the two channels and Family; DHX Media's licensing agreement with Disney formally ended at the beginning of January 2016.

Present day 
Disney Channel originally operated as an "exempted" Category B service: under new policies implemented in 2012, channels with less than 200,000 subscribers that would otherwise meet the definition of a Category B service are exempted from licensing by the Canadian Radio-television and Telecommunications Commission. On September 1, 2017, the channel became a regularly licensed discretionary service.

In December 2022, Disney Channel, Disney Junior, and Disney XD were added to the streaming bundle StackTV, to accompany Teletoon, Treehouse, and YTV.

Programming

Disney Channel primarily airs animated, live-action series and movies from its U.S. counterpart. It also airs programming from sister channels Disney XD and Disney Junior, interstitial programs such as Movie Surfers, a look at the latest movies from The Walt Disney Company, and special previews of new shows. In order to fulfill Canadian content requirements, Disney Channel also airs programming from other Corus-owned networks.

Programming blocks

Current 

Disney Junior (branded as Mickey Mornings on-air) – a weekday morning programming block featuring programming from Disney Junior.  The block was originally discontinued after December 18, 2015, due to the launch of the new Corus-operated Disney Junior channel. However, the 2-day special preview of the new Disney Junior show, Mickey and the Roadster Racers, premiered on January 21, 2017, at 9:00 a.m. EST across all English-language Disney channels in Canada as a simulcast and aired the preview on Disney Channel and Disney XD until January 22, 2017. The block returned in April 2018.

Former 

Disney XD on Disney Channel – a late Friday night/early Saturday morning (formerly weekend afternoon, then Thursday night) programming block featuring programs from Disney XD that are targeted at children's ages 6 to 15. The block was put on hiatus after November 29, 2015, due to the launch of the new Corus-operated Disney XD channel. The Disney XD on Disney Channel block also airs occasionally on weekends to show special episodes such as the Lab Rats: Elite Force premiere episode. The block returned on November 3, 2016, after an 11-month hiatus and began airing on Thursday evenings from 8 p.m. to 10 p.m. EST/PST. The block was put on hiatus again after May 25, 2017, but then returned on September 2, 2017, with Spider-Man, Milo Murphy's Law: Missing Milo, and Walk the Prank.
 Famalama DingDong – a four-day block with former sister channels YTV and Teletoon (still owned by Corus). It showed the world premiere of Disney Channel's newest show Stuck in the Middle along with movies like Invisible Sister and new episodes of Girl Meets World on February 12, 2016. It was the last channel to air on February 15, 2016, after YTV and Teletoon. It returned as a YTV-exclusive since 2019.

References

External links

Disney Channel Canada Schedule

Children's television networks in Canada
Corus Entertainment networks
Television channels and stations established in 2015
Digital cable television networks in Canada
Canada
English-language television stations in Canada
2015 establishments in Canada